China Huanqiu Contracting & Engineering Corporation is a construction subsidiary of China National Petroleum Corporation specializing in the construction of refineries and chemical fertilizer plants connected to refineries, and mining plants.

References

Construction and civil engineering companies of China